The Book of the Kings of Judah and Israel was separated into the two books of I Kings and II Kings in the Old Testament. The passage reads: "And, behold, the acts of Asa, first and last, lo, they are written in the book of the kings of Judah and Israel." And Amaziah his son succeeded him as king." 

This name is sometimes written The Book of the Kings of Israel and Judah.

See also 
 Table of books of Judeo-Christian Scripture
 Chronicles of the Kings of Israel
 Chronicles of the Kings of Judah
 Lost work

Lost Jewish texts